The Peekskill Highlanders were a minor league baseball team based in Peekskill, New York. Early "Peekskill" teams played as members of the Class C level Hudson River League (1888, 1903, 1905) before the Highlanders were members of the Class D level North Atlantic League from 1946 to 1949. The Peekskill Highlanders hosted home games at Peekskill Stadium and were a minor league affiliate of the New York Giants in 1946 and 1947 and St. Louis Browns in 1948.

History

Hudson River League 1888, 1903, 1905
Peekskill first had minor league baseball in 1888, with a team in the Independent level Hudson River League. The 1888 Hudson River League stopped play on June 7, 1888.

In their second season of play, Peekskill returned to the 1903 Class C level Hudson River League, which reformed after a fifteen–year absence. On March 25, 1903 and on April 1, 1903 meetings were held which resulted in forming the Hudson River League for 1903. Peekskill ended the 1903 season with an official record of 48–39, 3rd in the Hudson River League. Peekskill actually rejoined the league on August 10, 1903, being given the same record as Poughkeepsie, 21–24. Fred Valentine served as Peekskill manager. Valentine had been manager of the semi–professional team in Peekskill. Peekskill had been initially supportive of becoming a 1903 Hudson Valley League member when the league was formed. However, Peekskill realized that playing five to six games a week would require their players to leave more “lucrative positions” in their regular jobs. Peekskill instead played independent exhibition games and Valentine eventually reapplied for admission to the Hudson River League. Peekskill was accepted as a seventh team on August 2, 1903. Peekskill folded from the Hudson River League after the season, having experienced financial difficulties in their brief period of play in the league.

In 1905, Peekskill played a final and partial season in the Class C level Hudson River League. Peekskill ended the 1905 season with a record of 5–13 when the Peekskill franchise disbanded on June 1, 1905. Paddy Burke and Walter Dobbins served as managers in 1905.

Highlanders: North Atlantic League 1946 to 1949
Minor league baseball returned to Peekskill in 1946. The Peekskill Highlanders became charter members of the Class D North Atlantic League as an affiliate of the New York Giants. The North Atlantic League standings featured the Peekskill Highlanders 82–32, Nazareth Cement Dusters 78–40, Stroudsburg Poconos 72–47, Carbondale Pioneers 69–48, Nyack Rockies 67–53, Bloomingdale Troopers 41–78, Mahanoy City Bluebirds 30–79 and Newburgh Hummingbirds/Walden Hummingbirds 27–89.

The Peekskill Highlanders won the 1946 North Atlantic League championship in their first season. The Highlanders ended the 1946 season with a record of 82–32, 1st in the regular season standings, 6.0 games ahead of the 2nd place Nazareth Cement Dusters, playing under Manager Tony Ravish. In the Playoffs, the Highlanders defeated the Stroudsburg Poconos 4 games to 2. In the Finals, the Peekskill Highlanders won the championship by defeating the Carbondale Pioneers 4 games to 3. Playing at Peekskill Stadium, season home attendance was 51,200, an average of 898 per home game. The Highlanders' Tony Napoles pitched to an 18–0 record with a 2.32 ERA in the 1946 regular season. Napoles then had a 4–0 record in the playoffs, for a final record of 22–0.

In their second season of North Atlantic League play, the 1947 Peekskill Highlanders reached the Finals of the North Atlantic League. Remaining as a New York Giants affiliate, Peekskill finished the 1947 regular season with a record of 69–64, 3rd in the North Atlantic League standings under player/Manager Al Gardella. In the Playoffs, Peekskill defeated the Kingston Dodgers 4 games to 1. In the North Atlantic League Finals, the Carbondale Pioneers beat the Peekskill Highlanders in five games. Season attendance was 23,300, an average of 350.

The 1948 Peekskill Highlanders won the North Atlantic League Pennant under player/Manager Al Gardella. Playing as a St. Louis Browns affiliate, the Highlanders advanced to the Finals for the third consecutive season. Peekskill ended the 1948 regular season with a record of 84–49, 1st in the North Atlantic League and 2.0 games ahead of the 2nd place Carbondale Pioneers. In the 1948 Playoffs, Peekskill Highlanders defeated the Bloomingdale Troopers 4 games to 3. In the Finals, Carbondale swept the Peekskill Highlanders in four games. Home season attendance was 42,023, an average of 632.

The Peekskill Highlanders played their final North Atlantic League season in 1949, advancing to the Finals for the fourth consecutive season. The Highlanders ended the 1949 regular season with a record of 64–75, 4th in the North Atlantic League standings with Al Gardella again serving as Manager. In the Playoffs, the Peekskill Highlanders defeated the Lebanon Chix 4 games to 1. In the Finals, the Stroudsburg Poconos defeated the Peekskill Highlanders in six games. Stroudsburg had finished the regular season with a 101–36 record and are listed among The National Baseball Association's top 100 minor league teams. The final season of play at Peekskill stadium saw total attendance of 27,300 an average of 393. Peekskill folded after the 1949 season. The North Atlantic League itself folded after the 1950 season.

Peekskill has not fielded another minor league team.

The Highlanders owner was Lou Baselice of Mount Vernon, New York. Baselice was the simultaneous owner of both the Peekskill Highlanders and the Poughkeepsie Chiefs of the Colonial League. It was said Baselice would move his best Peekskill players to Poughkeepsie.

In July, 2012, former Peekskill players and fans gathered for a 3–day reunion event at the Peekskill Museum, celebrating minor league baseball in Peekskill.

Today, Peekskill has a franchise in the Hudson Valley Collegiate Baseball League.

The ballpark
From 1946 to 1949 the Peekskill Highlanders played minor league home games at Peekskill Stadium. The stadium had a capacity of 3,700. The original Peekskill Stadium was torn down and the site is a retail area today. The ballpark was located on Grant Avenue between East Main & Park Streets, Peekskill, New York. Today, a new "Peekskill Stadium," which opened in 2004, hosts baseball. The new ballpark is located at 30 Louisa Street, Peekskill, New York.

Timeline

Year–by–year records

Notable alumni

Pidge Browne (1949)
Al Gardella (1946, 1947–1949, MGR)
Joe Lake (1905)

See also
Peekskill Highlanders players

References

External links
Baseball Reference

Defunct minor league baseball teams
Professional baseball teams in New York (state)
Defunct baseball teams in New York (state)
Baseball teams established in 1946
Baseball teams disestablished in 1949
Peekskill, New York
New York Giants minor league affiliates
St. Louis Browns minor league affiliates
North Atlantic League teams
1946 establishments in New York (state)
1949 disestablishments in New York (state)